Trade secrets are a type of intellectual property that includes formulas, practices, processes, designs, instruments, patterns, or compilations of information that have inherent economic value because they are not generally known or readily ascertainable by others, and which the owner takes reasonable measures to keep secret. Intellectual property law gives the owner of a trade secret the right to restrict others from disclosing it. In some jurisdictions, such secrets are referred to as confidential information.

Definition

The precise language by which a trade secret is defined varies by jurisdiction, as do the particular types of information that are subject to trade secret protection. Three factors are common to all such definitions:

A trade secret is information that

 is not generally known to the public;
 confers economic benefit on its holder  the information is not publicly known; and
 where the holder makes reasonable efforts to maintain its secrecy.

In international law, these three factors define a trade secret under article 39 of the Agreement on Trade-Related Aspects of Intellectual Property Rights, commonly referred to as the TRIPS Agreement.

Similarly, in the United States Economic Espionage Act of 1996, "A trade secret, as defined under (3)(A),(B) (1996), has three parts: (1) information; (2) reasonable measures taken to protect the information; and (3) which derives independent economic value from not being publicly known."

Value
Trade secrets are an important, but invisible component of a company's intellectual property (IP). Their contribution to a company's value, measured as its market capitalization, can be major. Being invisible, that contribution is hard to measure. Still, research shows that changes in trade secrets laws affect business spending on R&D and patents. This research provides indirect evidence of the value of trade secrecy.

Protection
In contrast to registered intellectual property, trade secrets are, by definition, not disclosed to the world at large. Instead, owners of trade secrets seek to protect trade secret information from competitors by instituting special procedures for handling it, as well as implementing both technological and legal security measures. The most common reason for trade secret disputes to arise is when former employees of trade secret-bearing companies leave to work for a competitor and are suspected of taking or using valuable confidential information belonging to their former employer. Legal protections include non-disclosure agreements (NDAs), and work-for-hire and non-compete clauses. In other words, in exchange for an opportunity to be employed by the holder of secrets, an employee may sign agreements to not reveal their prospective employer's proprietary information, to surrender or assign to their employer ownership rights to intellectual work and work-products produced during the course (or as a condition) of employment, and to not work for a competitor for a given period of time (sometimes within a given geographic region). Violation of the agreement generally carries the possibility of heavy financial penalties which operate as a disincentive to reveal trade secrets. Trade secret information can be protected through legal action including an injunction preventing breaches of confidentiality, monetary damages, and, in some instances, punitive damages and attorneys’ fees too. In extraordinary circumstances, an ex parte seizure under the Defend Trade Secrets Act (DTSA) also allows for the court to seize property to prevent the propagation or dissemination of the trade secret. However, proving a breach of an NDA by a former stakeholder who is legally working for a competitor or prevailing in a lawsuit for breaching a non-compete clause can be very difficult. A holder of a trade secret may also require similar agreements from other parties he or she deals with, such as vendors, licensees, and board members.

As a company can protect its confidential information through NDA, work-for-hire, and non-compete contracts with its stakeholders (within the constraints of employment law, including only restraint that is reasonable in geographic- and time-scope), these protective contractual measures effectively create a perpetual monopoly on secret information that does not expire as would a patent or copyright. The lack of formal protection associated with registered intellectual property rights, however, means that a third party not bound by a signed agreement is not prevented from independently duplicating and using the secret information once it is discovered, such as through reverse engineering.

Therefore, trade secrets such as secret formulae are often protected by restricting the key information to a few trusted individuals. Famous examples of products protected by trade secrets are Chartreuse liqueur and Coca-Cola.

Because protection of trade secrets can, in principle, extend indefinitely, it may provide an advantage over patent protection and other registered intellectual property rights, which last only for a specific duration. For example, the Coca-Cola company has no patent for the formula of Coca-Cola and has been effective in protecting it for many more years than the 20 years of protection that a patent would have provided. In fact, Coca-Cola refused to reveal its trade secret under at least two judges' orders.

Misappropriation

Companies often try to discover one another's trade secrets through lawful methods of reverse engineering or employee poaching on one hand, and potentially unlawful methods including industrial espionage on the other. Acts of industrial espionage are generally illegal in their own right under the relevant governing laws, and penalties can be harsh. The importance of that illegality to trade secret law is: if a trade secret is acquired by improper means (a somewhat wider concept than "illegal means" but inclusive of such means), then the secret is generally deemed to have been misappropriated. Thus, if a trade secret has been acquired via industrial espionage, its acquirer will probably be subject to legal liability for having acquired it improperly⁠—this notwithstanding, the holder of the trade secret is nevertheless obliged to protect against such espionage to some degree in order to safeguard the secret, as under most trade secret regimes, a trade secret is not deemed to exist unless its purported holder takes reasonable steps to maintain its secrecy.

History

Roman law
The Roman law is described as follows:

[T]he Roman owner of a mark or firm name was legally protected against unfair usage by a competitor through the actio servi corrupti ... which the Roman jurists used to grant commercial relief under the guise of private law actions. "If, as the writer believes [writes Schiller], various private cases of action were available in satisfying commercial needs, the state was acting in exactly the same fashion as it does at the present day."

The suggestion that trade secret law has its roots in Roman law was introduced in 1929 in a Columbia Law Review article called "Trade Secrets and the Roman Law: The Actio Servi Corrupti", which has been reproduced in Schiller's, An American Experience in Roman Law 1 (1971). See Trade Secrets and Roman Law: The Myth Exploded, at 19. However, the University of Georgia Law School professor Alan Watson argued in Trade Secrets and Roman Law: The Myth Exploded that the actio servi corrupti was not used to protect trade secrets. Rather, he explained:

Schiller is sadly mistaken as to what was going on. ... The actio servi corrupti presumably or possibly could be used to protect trade secrets and other similar commercial interests. That was not its purpose and was, at most, an incidental spin-off. But there is not the slightest evidence that the action was ever so used. In this regard the actio servi corrupti is not unique.

Exactly the same can be said of many private law actions including those for theft, damage to property, deposit, and production of property. All of these could, I suppose, be used to protect trade secrets, etc., but there is no evidence they were. It is bizarre to see any degree the Roman actio servi corrupti as the counterpart of modern law for the protection of trade secrets and other such commercial interests.

19th century

Trade secret law as known today made its first appearance in England in 1817 in Newbery v. James, and in the United States in 1837 in Vickery v. Welch.

Trade secrets law continued to evolve throughout the United States as a hodgepodge of state laws. In 1939, the American Law Institute issued the Restatement of Torts, containing a summary of trade secret laws across states, which served as the primary resource until the latter part of the century. As of 2013, however, only four states—Massachusetts, New Jersey, New York, and Texas—still rely on the Restatement as their primary source of guidance (other than their body of state case law). It has also been recently theorized that the doctrine of trade secrets should protect competitively valuable, personal information of company executives, in a concept known as "executive trade secrets".

Worldwide

Commonwealth nations
In Commonwealth common law jurisdictions, confidentiality and trade secrets are regarded as an equitable right rather than a property right.

England and Wales

The Court of Appeal of England and Wales in the case of Saltman Engineering Co Ltd v. Campbell Engineering Ltd held that the action for breach of confidence is based on a principle of preserving "good faith".

The test for a cause of action for breach of confidence in the common law world is set out in the case of Coco v. A.N. Clark (Engineers) Ltd:

 The information itself must have the necessary quality of confidence about it;
 That information must have been imparted in circumstances imparting an obligation of confidence;
 There must be an unauthorized use of that information to the detriment of the party communicating it.

The "quality of confidence" highlights that trade secrets are a legal concept. With sufficient effort or through illegal acts (such as breaking and entering), competitors can usually obtain trade secrets. However, so long as the owner of the trade secret can prove that reasonable efforts have been made to keep the information confidential, the information remains a trade secret and generally remains legally protected. Conversely, trade secret owners who cannot evidence reasonable efforts at protecting confidential information risk losing the trade secret, even if the information is obtained by competitors illegally. It is for this reason that trade secret owners shred documents and do not simply recycle them.

A successful plaintiff is entitled to various forms of judicial relief, including:

 An injunction
 An account of profits or an award of damages
 A declaration

Hong Kong
Hong Kong does not follow the traditional commonwealth approach, instead recognizing trade secrets where a judgment of the High Court indicates that confidential information may be a property right.

European Union
The EU adopted a Directive on the Protection of Trade Secrets on 27 May 2016. The goal of the directive is to harmonize the definition of trade secrets in accordance with existing international standards, and the means of obtaining protection of trade secrets within the EU.

United States
Within the U.S., trade secrets generally encompass a company's proprietary information that is not generally known to its competitors, and which provides the company with a competitive advantage.

Although trade secrets law evolved under state common law, prior to 1974, the question of whether patent law preempted state trade secrets law had been unanswered.  In 1974, the United States Supreme Court issued the landmark decision, Kewanee Oil Co. v. Bicron Corp., which resolved the question in favor of allowing the states to freely develop their own trade secret laws.

State law

In 1979, several U.S. states adopted the Uniform Trade Secrets Act (UTSA), which was further amended in 1985, with approximately 47 states having adopted some variation of it as the basis for trade secret law. Another significant development is the Economic Espionage Act (EEA) of 1996, which makes the theft or misappropriation of a trade secret a federal crime.

This law contains two provisions criminalizing two sorts of activity.
 , criminalizes the theft of trade secrets to benefit foreign powers.
 , criminalizes their theft for commercial or economic purposes.

The statutory penalties are different for the two offenses.  The EEA was extended in 2016 to allow companies to file civil suits in federal court.

Federal law
On May 11, 2016, President Obama signed the Defend Trade Secrets Act (DTSA), 18 U.S.C. §§ 1839 et seq., which for the first time created a federal cause of action for misappropriating trade secrets.  The DTSA provides for both a private right of action for damages and injunction and a civil action for injunction brought by the Attorney General.

The statute followed state laws on liability in significant part, defining trade secrets in the same way as the Uniform Trade Secrets Act as,

However, the law contains several important differences from prior law.
 Because it is a federal law, trade secret cases can be prosecuted in federal courts with concomitant procedural advantages.
 It provides for the unusual remedy of preliminary seizure of "property necessary to prevent the propagation or dissemination of the trade secret," 18 U.S.C. §1836
 It provides for remedies to include royalties in appropriate cases and exemplary damages up to two times the actual damages in cases of "willful and malicious" appropriation, 18 U.S.C. §1836(b)(3).
The DTSA also clarifies that a United States resident (including a company) can be liable for misappropriation that takes place outside the United States, and any person can be liable as long as an act in furtherance of the misappropriation takes place in the United States, 18 U.S.C. §1837. The DTSA provides the courts with broad injunctive powers.  18 U.S.C. §1836(b)(3).

The DTSA does not preempt or supplant state laws, but provides an additional cause of action.  Because states vary significantly in their approach to the "inevitable disclosure" doctrine, its use has limited, if any, application under the DTSA, 18 U.S.C.§1836(b)(3)(A).

Comparison to other types of intellectual property law
In the United States, trade secrets are not protected by law in the same manner as patents or trademarks. Historically, trademarks and patents are protected under federal statutes, the Lanham Act and Patent Act, respectively, while trade secrets are usually protected under state laws, and most states have enacted the Uniform Trade Secrets Act (UTSA), except for Massachusetts, New York, and North Carolina. However, since 2016 this situation changed with the enactment of the Defend Trade Secrets Act (DTSA), making trade secrets also protectable under a federal law. One of the differences between patents and trademarks, on the one hand, and trade secrets, on the other, is that a trade secret is protected only when the owner has taken reasonable measures to protect the information as a secret (see (3)(A)).

Comparison with trademarks
Nations have different trademark policies. Assuming the mark in question meets certain other standards of protectibility, trademarks are generally protected from infringement on the grounds that other uses might confuse consumers as to the origin or nature of the goods once the mark has been associated with a particular supplier. Similar considerations apply to service marks and trade dress.

By definition, a trademark enjoys no protection (qua trademark) until and unless it is "disclosed" to consumers, for only then are consumers able to associate it with a supplier or source in the requisite manner. (That a company plans to  a certain trademark might itself be protectable as a trade secret, however, until the mark is actually made public.)

To acquire a trademark rights under U.S. law, one must simply use the mark "in commerce".  It is possible to register a trademark in the United States, both at the federal and state levels.  Registration of trademarks confers some advantages, including stronger protection in certain respects, but registration is not required in order to get protection. Registration may be required in order to file a lawsuit for trademark infringement.

Comparison with patents
To acquire a patent, full information about the method or product has to be supplied to the patent office and upon publication or issuance, will then be available to all. After expiration of the patent, competitors can copy the method or product legally. The temporary monopoly on the subject matter of the patent is regarded as a tradeoff for thus disclosing the information to the public.

It may be possible to obtain patent protection for a trade secret. In order to obtain a patent, the inventor must disclose the invention, so that others will be able to both make and use the invention. To obtain a patent in the United States, any preference for the mode of practicing the invention must be disclosed. Often, an invention will be improved after filing of the patent application, and additional information will be learned. None of that additional information must be disclosed through the patent application process, and it may thus be kept as a trade secret. That nondisclosed information will often increase the commercial viability of the patent. Most patent licenses include clauses that require the inventor to disclose any trade secrets they have, and patent licensors must be careful to maintain their trade secrets while licensing a patent through such means as the use of a non-disclosure agreement.

Compared to patents, the advantages of trade secrets are that a trade secret is not limited in time (it "continues indefinitely as long as the secret is not revealed to the public", whereas a patent is only in force for a specified time, after which others may freely copy the invention), a trade secret does not imply any registration costs, has an immediate effect, does not require compliance with any formalities, and does not imply any disclosure of the invention to the public. The disadvantages of trade secrets include that "others may be able to legally discover the secret and be thereafter entitled to use it", "others may obtain patent protection for legally discovered secrets", and a trade secret is more difficult to enforce than a patent.

Criticism
Trade secret regulations that mask the composition of chemical agents in consumer products have been criticized for allowing the trade secret holders to hide the presence of potentially harmful and toxic substances. It has been argued that the public is being denied a clear picture of such products' safety, whereas competitors are well positioned to analyze its chemical composition. In 2004, the National Environmental Trust tested 40 common consumer products; in more than half of them they found toxic substances not listed on the product label.

Cases
 Data General Corp. v. Digital Computer Controls, Inc., 297 A.2d 433 (Del. Ch. 1971): protection and disclosure of design documents.
 Rivendell Forest Prods. v. Georgia-Pacific Corp., 28 F.3d 1042: trade secrets and software systems.
IBM v. Papermaster (No. 08-9078, 2008 U.S. Dist): Mark Papermaster moving from IBM to Apple computer in 2008.
Du Pont de Nemours and Company v. Kolon Industries Incorporated, Nos. 10-1103, 10-1275. U.S. Court of Appeals for the Fourth Circuit.  Argued Oct. 26, 2010–March 11, 2011. trade secrets case involving Kevlar fiber, resulting in award to DuPont of ~US$920 million.
Silvaco Data Systems v. Intel Corp. addressed the question of whether possession of software object code can result in misappropriation of trade secrets
Christou v. Beatport, LLC constituted that MySpace profiles could be held as trade secrets.

See also
 Biswamohan Pani, charged in 2008 with stealing $1 billion worth of trade secrets from Intel
 Data breach
 Glossary of legal terms in technology
 Trade secrets in Canada

References and notes

Further reading
Eiichiro Kubota: Protection of Trade Secrets in Japan. A.I.P.P.I. (Journal of International Association for the Protection of Intellectual Property of Japan) 36(5), 231 - 238 (2011), 
Economic Espionage and Trade Secrets, U.S. Attorneys' Bulletin (2009).

External links
 Economic Espionage - FBI Launches Nationwide Awareness Campaign
 Teaching industry how to protect trade secrets and national security, FBI

 
Intellectual property law
Secrecy
Intangible assets